Apoctena is a genus of moths belonging to family Tortricidae.

Species
Apoctena clarkei (Philpott, 1930)
Apoctena conditana (Walker, 1863)
Apoctena fastigata (Philpott, 1916)
Apoctena flavescens (Butler, 1877)
Apoctena orthocopa (Meyrick, 1924)
Apoctena orthropis (Meyrick, 1901)
Apoctena persecta (Meyrick, 1914)
Apoctena pictoriana (Felder & Rogenhofer, 1875)
Apoctena spatiosa (Philpott, 1923)
Apoctena syntona (Meyrick, in Chilton, 1909)
Apoctena taipana (Felder & Rogenhofer, 1875)
Apoctena tigris (Philpott, 1914)

See also
List of Tortricidae genera

References

 , 2005: World Catalogue of Insects volume 5 Tortricidae.
  1990: Reassessment of Ctenopseustis Meyrick and Planotortrix Dugdale with descriptions of two new genera (Lepidoptera: Tortricidae). New Zealand Journal of Zoology, 17: 437–465.

External links
Tortricid.net

Epitymbiini
Tortricidae genera